The Church is a studio album by Mr. Oizo. The album was released on November 18, 2014, under Brainfeeder Records.

Critical reception
AllMusic wrote that "while the best songs here are entertaining individually, they tend to diminish each other within the album's context.

Track listing 
All tracks written and produced by Quentin Dupieux except where noted.

References

Mr. Oizo albums
2014 albums